Charlie Dunbar Broad  (30 December 1887 – 11 March 1971), usually cited as C. D. Broad, was an English epistemologist, historian of philosophy, philosopher of science, moral philosopher, and writer on the philosophical aspects of psychical research. He was known for his thorough and dispassionate examinations of arguments in such works as Scientific Thought (1923), The Mind and Its Place in Nature (1925), and Examination of McTaggart's Philosophy (2 vols., 1933–1938).

Broad's essay on "Determinism, Indeterminism, and Libertarianism" in Ethics and the History of Philosophy (1952) introduced the philosophical terms occurrent causation and non-occurrent causation, which became the basis for the contemporary distinction between "agent-causal" and "event-causal" in debates on libertarian free will.

Biography 
Broad was born in Harlesden, in Middlesex, England.

He was educated at Dulwich College from 1900 until 1906. He gained a scholarship in 1906 to study at Trinity College, Cambridge, graduating in 1910 with First-Class Honours, with distinction. He became a Fellow of Trinity College the following year.

Career 
As his fellowship at Trinity College was a non-residential position, he was also able to accept a position as an assistant lecturer that he had applied for at St Andrews University, where he remained until 1920. That year, he was appointed professor at Bristol University, working there until 1923, when he returned to Trinity as a lecturer. From 1926 until 1931, he was a lecturer in 'moral science' at Cambridge University's Faculty of Philosophy.

Later at Cambridge, he was appointed in 1931 as 'Sidgwick Lecturer', a role he would keep until 1933, when he was appointed Knightbridge Professor of Moral Philosophy at the University, a position he held for twenty years (until 1953). In 1927 he gave the British Academy's Master-Mind Lecture, entitled Sir Isaac Newton.

In addition, Broad was President of the Aristotelian Society from 1927 to 1928, and again from 1954 to 1955. He was also President of the Society for Psychical Research in 1935 and 1958.

Personal life 
Broad was openly homosexual at a time when homosexual acts were illegal. In March 1958, Broad along with fellow philosophers A.J. Ayer and Bertrand Russell, writer J.B. Priestley and 27 others sent a letter to The Times which urged the acceptance of the Wolfenden Report's recommendation that homosexual acts should "no longer be a criminal offence."

Theory

Psychical research 
Broad argued that if research could demonstrate that psychic events occur, this would challenge philosophical theories of "basic limiting principles" in at least five ways:

 Backward causation (i.e., the future affecting the past) is rejected by many philosophers, but would be shown to occur if, for example, people could predict the future.
 One common argument against dualism (i.e., the belief that, while bodies are physical entities, minds are a different, non-physical sort of entity) is that physical and non-physical things cannot interact. However, this would be shown to be possible if people can move physical objects by thought (telekinesis).
 Similarly, philosophers tend to be skeptical about claims that non-physical 'stuff' could interact with anything. This would also be challenged if minds are shown to be able to communicate with each other, as would be the case if mind-reading is possible.
 Philosophers generally accept that we can only learn about the world through reason and perception. This belief would be challenged if people were able to psychically perceive events in other places.
 Physicalist philosophers believe that there cannot be persons without bodies. If ghosts were shown to exist, this view would be challenged.

Free will 
In his essay "Determinism, Indeterminism, and Libertarianism", Broad argued for non-occurrent causation as "literally determined by the agent or self." The agent could be considered as a substance or continuant, and not by a total cause which contains as factors events in and dispositions of the agent. Thus, our efforts would be completely determined, but their causes would not be prior events. New series of events would then originate, which he called "continuants", which are essentially causa sui.

Peter van Inwagen says that Broad formulated an excellent version of what van Inwagen has called the "Consequence Argument" in defence of incompatibilism.

Works 
 1914. Perception, physics and reality. An Enquiry into the Information that Physical Science can Supply about the Real. London: Cambridge University Press. .
 1923. Scientific thought. New York: Harcourt, Brace and Co..
 1925. The Mind and Its Place in Nature. London: Kegan.
 1926. The Philosophy of Francis Bacon. Cambridge: Cambridge University Press.
 1930. Five types of ethical theory. New York: Harcourt, Brace and Co.
 1931. War Thoughts in Peace Time. London: Humphrey Milford.
 1933. Examination of McTaggart's philosophy. Vol. 1. Cambridge University Press.
 1934. Determinism, interdeterminism and libertarianism. Cambridge: Cambridge University Press.
 1938. Examination of McTaggart's philosophy. Vol. 2. Cambridge University Press.
 1952/2000. Ethics and the History of Philosophy. Routledge. .
 1953/2000. Religion, Philosophy and Psychic Research. Routledge. .
 1955. Human Personality and the Possibility of Its Survival. University of California Press.
 1958. Personal Identity and Survival. London: Society for Psychical Research.
 1962. Lectures on Psychical Research. Incorporating the Perrott Lectures given in Cambridge University in 1959 and 1960. New York: Humanities Press.
 contains Saltmarsh's Investigation of Mrs Warren Elliott's Mediumship." Lectures on Psychical Research. Incorporating the Perrott Lectures given in Cambridge University in 1959 and 1960. New York: Humanities Press.
 1968. Induction, Probability, and Causation. Selected Papers of C. D. Broad, Dordrecht: Reidel.
 1971. Broad's Critical Essays in Moral Philosophy, New York: Humanities Press.
 1975. Leibniz: An Introduction, Cambridge: Cambridge University Press. 
 1976. Berkeley's Argument. Haskell House Pub Ltd.
 1978. Kant: An Introduction. Cambridge: Cambridge University Press. 
 1985. Ethics. Dordrecht: Nijhoff.

Notes

References

Sources 
 Borchert, Donald M., ed. 2006. Encyclopedia of Philosophy, Volume 1 (2nd ed.). Farmington Hills, MI: Macmillan Reference.

Further reading 
 Britton, Karl. 1978. "Charlie Dunbar Broad, 1887–1971." Proceedings of the British Academy 64:289–310.
 Schilpp, Paul. 1959. The Philosophy of C. D. Broad. Tudor: New York.

External links 

 Charlie Dunbar Broad entry at The Stanford Encyclopedia of Philosophy
 C. D. Broad: a bibliography. Provides full pdf's of most of Broad's writings.
 C. D. Broad on Digital Text International
 Papers of Charlie Dunbar Broad

1887 births
1971 deaths
20th-century English male writers
20th-century English philosophers
20th-century essayists
Academics of the University of St Andrews
Action theorists
Alumni of Trinity College, Cambridge
Analytic philosophers
Aristotelian philosophers
British ethicists
British gay writers
British historians of philosophy
British male essayists
British male non-fiction writers
British consciousness researchers and theorists
English essayists
English gay writers
English historians of philosophy
English logicians
English writers on paranormal topics
Epistemologists
Fellows of Trinity College, Cambridge
George Berkeley scholars
Gottfried Wilhelm Leibniz scholars
Historians of science
Kant scholars
LGBT historians
LGBT philosophers
English LGBT rights activists
British LGBT rights activists
English LGBT writers
Libertarian theorists
Metaphysics writers
Ontologists
British parapsychologists
People educated at Dulwich College
People from Harlesden
Philosophers of logic
Philosophers of mind
Philosophers of religion
Philosophers of science
Philosophers of time
Philosophers of war
Presidents of the Aristotelian Society
Probability theorists
Writers about activism and social change
Writers about religion and science
Knightbridge Professors of Philosophy